Rubin Goldmark (August 15, 1872 – March 6, 1936) was an American composer, pianist, and educator.  Although in his time he was an often-performed American nationalist composer, his works are seldom played now. Today he is best known as the teacher of other important composers, including Aaron Copland and George Gershwin.

Early life

Rubin Goldmark was born in New York City in 1872, a nephew of composer Karl Goldmark, and of Jewish heritage. Goldmark completed his undergraduate studies at City College in New York. After completing his studies in the United States in 1889, Goldmark traveled to Austria, where he studied at the Vienna Conservatory until 1891. There he studied piano and composition, the former with Alfred von Livonius, the latter with Johann Nepomuk Fuchs.

Return to the United States
After the conclusion of his studies in Vienna, Goldmark returned to United States. From 1891 to 1893 he taught piano and music theory at the National Conservatory in New York City.  While in New York, Goldmark also studied composition with Antonín Dvořák and piano with Rafael Joseffy.  Goldmark moved to Colorado Springs, Colorado, hoping to improve his poor health, and was the director of the Colorado Conservatory of Music from 1895 to 1901.
	
Upon Goldmark's return to New York in 1902, he focused much of his energy on teaching.  Over the 30-year period that Goldmark remained in New York he gave over five hundred lectures on music, music theory, and composition.  That is not to say he ceased composing all together – while Goldmark's music lies out of the standard repertoire of the twentieth century, he was highly regarded by his contemporaries.  He was also the founder and frequent speaker at The Bohemians, a New York musicians' club.

Teaching career
While Goldmark began his career as a composer and pianist, he is best known for his work as a teacher.  When not lecturing, or composing, however, Goldmark taught several private students.  Famously, Goldmark taught a fifteen-year-old Aaron Copland and the young George Gershwin.  Though Copland was often critical of Goldmark because he found him "too pedantic and academic", Goldmark gave Copland a strong foundation which Copland would rely upon for the rest of his career (Howard, 252).

The young George Gershwin also turned to Goldmark during the composition of his piano Concerto in F.  While his Rhapsody in Blue had been orchestrated by Ferde Grofé, he wished to orchestrate his piano concerto himself, and sought Goldmark's advice (Howard, 249).  Goldmark's influence as a teacher extended beyond just Gershwin and Copland.  In 1924, Goldmark became the Head of Composition at the recently opened Juilliard School of Music in New York City.

Other notable students include composers Fannie Charles Dillon, Sammy Timberg, Vittorio Giannini, Frederick Jacobi and Alexei Haieff.

Musical works
Though seldom performed today, Goldmark's music was performed regularly during his lifetime.  In fact, his Negro Rhapsody was among the most performed pieces in the seven years following World War I.  In 1910, he was also awarded the 1909 Paderewski Prize for Chamber Music.  His other important works include Hiawatha, The Call of the Plains, and his Requiem.  Goldmark's nationalism is clearly evident from many of the titles of his works – even the ambiguously titled Requiem (perf. 1919) was inspired by Abraham Lincoln's Gettysburg Address. Goldmark's other compositions include a string quartet, a piano trio, a violin sonata, several orchestral pieces, piano music, and songs.

Footnotes

References

External links

 

1872 births
1936 deaths
19th-century American composers
19th-century American pianists
19th-century classical composers
19th-century classical pianists
19th-century American male musicians
20th-century American composers
20th-century American pianists
20th-century classical composers
20th-century classical pianists
20th-century American male musicians
American classical pianists
American male classical composers
American male classical pianists
American Romantic composers
Jewish American classical composers
Jewish classical pianists
Pupils of Antonín Dvořák
Pupils of Johann Nepomuk Fuchs